To You, from Me is a 1994 South Korean film directed by Jang Sun-woo. It was the fifth-highest grossing Korean film for the period 1990–95.

Synopsis
This erotic drama is about a writer involved in a plagiarism suit who becomes romantically involved with a woman with whom he is connected through dreams.

Cast
 Moon Sung-keun... "I"
 Jeong Seon-kyeong... Ba-ji
 Yeo Kyun-dong... Bank clerk
 Kim Boo-seon... Ma-dam
 Choe Jae-yeong... Baek Hyeon-du
 Gong Hyo-seok... Hyeon Jin-bal
 An Jin-hyeong... Saek An-gyeong
 Choi Sun-joong... Lee Jeong-bak

Director's statement
"I used pornography in this film as a style of expression and as a voice of criticism against... morality, the sense of values and the common sense of disjointed modern society."

Notes

Bibliography
 
 
 

1994 films
South Korean erotic films
1990s Korean-language films
Films directed by Jang Sun-woo